Separadi or Siperady or Separady may refer to:
Separadi, Lankaran, Azerbaijan
Separadi, Yardymli, Azerbaijan